World championships in sailing are world championships organised or sanctioned by World Sailing (formerly the International Sailing Federation or ISAF). As a sport, sailing has the largest number of world championships due to the diversity of equipment and disciplines.

Championships
The number of titles is due to the diversity of equipment. Sanctioned World Championships fall into the following categories:

World Sailing - Initiated Championships

World Sailing - Sanctioned World Championships

 ISAF Open Match Racing World Championship (Presently awarded to the overall winner of the World Match Racing Tour originally an world sailing event)
 Nations Cup
 Offshore Racing Congress Rating System
 Currently ORCi 
 former ORC Worlds include the IMS, IMS 500, IMS 670, 1/4 TON, 1/2 TON and 1 TON ClassWorld Championships 
 International Radio Sailing Association Class World Championships
 IRSA / 10 Rater World Championship 
 IRSA / Radio A Class World Championship 
 IRSA / Marblehead World Championships
 IRSA / One Metre World Championships 
 Extreme 40 World Championship (Authorised Once)
 International Association for Disabled Sailing (IFDS) (from 1990s to 2014)
 Blind Sailing World Championship originally recognised through IFDS
 Blind Match Racing World Championship  originally recognised through IFDS
 Other Disabled Sailing World Championships (Such as none technical)
 PWA World Championships also recognised as a special event

World Sailing - Class World Championships

Classes that are members of World Sailing are entitled to hold World Championships if they are spread into a minimum of two continents and have certain number of nations and continents take part in two of the last three championships (the number of nations depend of the size of the equipment).

Multiple World champions
This is not a complete list but the following are known to have won eight or more World Championship titles.

See also
List of World Championships medalists in sailing
World Sailing
European Sailing Championships

Notes

References

External links

ISAF Official site